Rosalind Frances Nash, née Shore-Smith (December 1862 – 17 October 1952) was a journalist and co-operator, and the niece and confidante of Florence Nightingale. She assisted in some of Nightingale's publications, and wrote on her behalf to Karl Pearson, when Pearson was writing his biography of Francis Galton.

Rosalind Shore-Smith was the elder daughter of Florence Nightingale's cousin William Shore Smith (afterwards Shore Nightingale), whom Florence Nightingale "regarded almost as a brother". Barbara (nee Margaret Thyra Barbara Shore-Smith), Rosalind's sister, married Sir Harry Lushington Stephen. Rosalind married the progressive economist Vaughan Nash in 1893; they lived at Loughton. After Florence Nightingale's death, Vaughan Nash played an important role in collating and copying her correspondence.

Rosalind is buried with her husband in Wellow graveyard.

Works
The accidents compensation act 1897, 1897
Life and death in the potteries, 1898
A Sketch of the Life of Florence Nightingale
 
(ed. with preface), Florence Nightingale's To Her Nurses. A Selection from her addresses to probationers and nurses of the Nightingale School at St.Thomas's Hospital.  London,Macmillan,1914
(ed. with Sir Edward Tyas Cook, The Life of Florence Nightingale, Macmillan and Co, London, 1925. (An abridged version of Cook's 2-volume The Life of Florence Nightingale, Macmillan and Co, London, 1913)
Florence Nightingale according to Mr. Strachey, 1928

References

1862 births
1952 deaths
Florence Nightingale